The genus Zingiber is native to Southeast Asia especially in Thailand, China, the Indian Subcontinent, and New Guinea.  It contains the true gingers, plants grown the world over for their culinary value. The most well known are Z. officinale and Z. mioga, two garden gingers.

Culinary
Each ginger species has a different culinary usage; for example, myoga is valued for the stem and flowers.  Garden ginger's rhizome is the classic spice "ginger", and may be used whole, candied (known commonly as crystallized ginger), or dried and powdered. Other popular gingers used in cooking include cardamom and turmeric, though neither of these examples is a "true ginger" – they belong to different genera in the family Zingiberaceae.

Species

Plants of the World Online currently includes:

 Zingiber acuminatum Valeton
 Zingiber aguingayae Docot
 Zingiber albiflorum R.M.Sm.
 Zingiber album Nurainas
 Zingiber anamalayanum Sujanapal & Sasidh.
 Zingiber angustifolium C.K.Lim & Meekiong
 Zingiber apoense Elmer
 Zingiber argenteum Mood & Theilade
 Zingiber arunachalensis A.Joe, T.Jayakr., Hareesh & M.Sabu
 Zingiber atroporphyreum Škornick. & Q.B.Nguyen
 Zingiber atrorubens Gagnep.
 Zingiber aurantiacum (Holttum) Theilade
 Zingiber banhaoense Mood & Theilade
 Zingiber barbatum Wall.
 Zingiber belumense C.K.Lim & Meekiong
 Zingiber bipinianum D.K.Roy, D.Verma, Talukdar & Dutta Choud.
 Zingiber bisectum D.Fang
 Zingiber brachystachys Triboun & K.Larsen
 Zingiber bradleyanum Craib
 Zingiber brevifolium N.E.Br.
 Zingiber bulusanense Elmer
 Zingiber callianthus Triboun & K.Larsen
 Zingiber capitatum Roxb.
 Zingiber cardiocheilum Škornick. & Q.B.Nguyen
 Zingiber castaneum Škornick. & Q.B.Nguyen
 Zingiber caudatum Biseshwori & Bipin
 Zingiber cernuum Dalzell
 Zingiber chantaranothaii Triboun & K.Larsen
 Zingiber chengii Y.H.Tseng, C.M.Wang & Y.C.Lin
 Zingiber chlorobracteatum Mood & Theilade
 Zingiber chrysanthum Roscoe
 Zingiber chrysostachys Ridl.
 Zingiber citriodorum Theilade & Mood
 Zingiber clarkei King ex Baker
 Zingiber cochleariforme D.Fang
 Zingiber collinsii Mood & Theilade
 Zingiber coloratum N.E.Br.
 Zingiber corallinum Hance
 Zingiber cornubracteatum Triboun & K.Larsen
 Zingiber curtisii Holttum
 Zingiber cylindricum Thwaites
 Zingiber densissimum S.Q.Tong & Y.M.Xia
 Zingiber discolor Škornick., H.Ð.Tran & Rybková
 Zingiber diwakarianum R.Kr.Singh
 Zingiber eberhardtii Gagnep.
 Zingiber eborinum Mood & Theilade
 Zingiber elatius (Ridl.) Theilade
 Zingiber elatum Roxb.
 Zingiber ellipticum (S.Q.Tong & Y.M.Xia) Q.G.Wu & T.L.Wu
 Zingiber engganoense Ardiyani
 Zingiber fallax (Loes.) L.Bai, Juan Chen & N.H.Xia
 Zingiber flagelliforme Mood & Theilade
 Zingiber flammeum Theilade & Mood
 Zingiber flaviflorum C.K.Lim & Meekiong
 Zingiber flavofusiforme M.M.Aung & Nob.Tanaka
 Zingiber flavomaculosum S.Q.Tong
 Zingiber flavovirens Theilade
 Zingiber fragile S.Q.Tong
 Zingiber fraseri Theilade
 Zingiber georgeae Mood & Theilade
 Zingiber gracile Jack
 Zingiber gramineum Noronha ex Blume
 Zingiber griffithii Baker
 Zingiber guangxiense D.Fang
 Zingiber gulinense Y.M.Xia
 Zingiber hainanense Y.S.Ye, L.Bai & N.H.Xia
 Zingiber idae Triboun & K.Larsen
 Zingiber incomptum B.L.Burtt & R.M.Sm.
 Zingiber inflexum Blume
 Zingiber integrilabrum Hance
 Zingiber integrum S.Q.Tong
 Zingiber intermedium Baker
 Zingiber isanense Triboun & K.Larsen
 Zingiber jiewhoei Škornick.
 Zingiber junceum Gagnep.
 Zingiber kangleipakense Kishor & Škornick.
 Zingiber kawagoii Hayata
 Zingiber kelabitianum Theilade & H.Chr.
 Zingiber kerrii Craib
 Zingiber kunstleri King ex Ridl.
 Zingiber lambii Mood & Theilade
 Zingiber laoticum Gagnep.
 Zingiber larsenii Theilade
 Zingiber latifolium Theilade & Mood
 Zingiber lecongkietii Škornick. & H.Ð.Tran
 Zingiber leptorrhizum D.Fang
 Zingiber leptostachyum Valeton
 Zingiber leucochilum L.Bai, Skornick. & N.H.Xia
 Zingiber ligulatum Roxb.
 Zingiber limianum Meekiong
 Zingiber lingyunense D.Fang
 Zingiber loerzingii Valeton
 Zingiber longibracteatum Theilade
 Zingiber longiglande D.Fang & D.H.Qin
 Zingiber longiligulatum S.Q.Tong
 Zingiber longipedunculatum Ridl.
 Zingiber longyanjiang Z.Y.Zhu
 Zingiber macradenium K.Schum.
 Zingiber macrocephalum (Zoll.) K.Schum.
 Zingiber macroglossum Valeton
 Zingiber macrorrhynchus K.Schum.
 Zingiber malaysianum C.K.Lim : black ginger
 Zingiber marginatum Roxb.
 Zingiber martini R.M.Sm.
 Zingiber matangense Noor Ain, Tawan & Meekiong
 Zingiber matupiense M.M.Aung & Nob.Tanaka
 Zingiber matutumense Mood & Theilade
 Zingiber mawangense Noor Ain & Meekiong
 Zingiber meghalayense Sushil K.Singh, Ram.Kumar & Mood
 Zingiber mekongense Gagnep.
 Zingiber mellis Škornick., H.Ð.Tran & Sída f.
 Zingiber microcheilum Škornick., H.Ð.Tran & Sída f.
 Zingiber mioga (Thunb.) Roscoe
 Zingiber mizoramense Ram.Kumar, Sushil K.Singh & S.Sharma
 Zingiber molle Ridl.
 Zingiber monglaense S.J.Chen & Z.Y.Chen
 Zingiber monophyllum Gagnep.
 Zingiber montanum (J.Koenig) Link ex A.Dietr. (synonyms: Z. cassumunar; Z. purpureum)
 Zingiber multibracteatum Holttum
 Zingiber murlenica Ram.Kumar, Sushil K.Singh & S.Sharma
 Zingiber nanlingense Lin Chen, A.Q.Dong & F.W.Xing
 Zingiber natmataungense S.S.Zhou & R.Li
 Zingiber nazrinii C.K.Lim & Meekiong
 Zingiber neesanum (J.Graham) Ramamoorthy
 Zingiber neglectum Valeton
 Zingiber negrosense Elmer
 Zingiber neotruncatum T.L.Wu, K.Larsen & Turland
 Zingiber nigrimaculatum S.Q.Tong
 Zingiber nimmonii (J.Graham) Dalzell
 Zingiber nitens M.F.Newman
 Zingiber niveum Mood & Theilade
 Zingiber odoriferum Blume
 Zingiber officinale Roscoe
 Zingiber oligophyllum K.Schum.
 Zingiber olivaceum Mood & Theilade
 Zingiber orbiculatum S.Q.Tong
 Zingiber ottensii Valeton
 Zingiber pachysiphon B.L.Burtt & R.M.Sm.
 Zingiber panduratum Roxb.
 Zingiber papuanum Valeton
 Zingiber pardocheilum Wall. ex Baker
 Zingiber parishii Hook.f.
 Zingiber pauciflorum L.Bai, Skornick., D.Z.Li & N.H.Xia
 Zingiber pellitum Gagnep.
 Zingiber pendulum Mood & Theilade
 Zingiber petiolatum (Holttum) Theilade
 Zingiber pherimaense Biseshwori & Bipin
 Zingiber phillippsiae Mood & Theilade
 Zingiber phumiangense Chaveer. & Mokkamul
 Zingiber pleiostachyum K.Schum.
 Zingiber plicatum Škornick. & Q.B.Nguyen
 Zingiber popaense Nob.Tanaka
 Zingiber porphyrochilum Y.H.Tan & H.B.Ding
 Zingiber porphyrosphaerum K.Schum.
 Zingiber pseudopungens R.M.Sm.
 Zingiber pseudosquarrosum L.J.Singh & P.Singh
 Zingiber puberulum Ridl.
 Zingiber purpureum Roscoe
 Zingiber pyroglossum Triboun & K.Larsen
 Zingiber raja C.K.Lim & Kharuk.
 Zingiber recurvatum S.Q.Tong & Y.M.Xia
 Zingiber roseum (Roxb.) Roscoe
 Zingiber rubens Roxb.
 Zingiber rufopilosum Gagnep.
 Zingiber sabuanum K.M.P.Kumar & A.Joe
 Zingiber sabun C.K.Lim
 Zingiber sadakornii Triboun & K.Larsen
 Zingiber salarkhanii M.A.Rahman & Yusuf
 Zingiber shuanglongense C.L.Yeh & S.W.Chung
 Zingiber simaoense Y.Y.Qian
 Zingiber singapurense Škornick.
 Zingiber skornickovae N.S.Lý
 Zingiber smilesianum Craib
 Zingiber spectabile Griff.
 Zingiber squarrosum Roxb.
 Zingiber stenostachys K.Schum.
 Zingiber striolatum Diels
 Zingiber subroseum Docot
 Zingiber sulphureum Burkill ex Theilade
 Zingiber tenuifolium L.Bai, Škornick. & N.H.Xia
 Zingiber tenuiscapus Triboun & K.Larsen
 Zingiber thorelii Gagnep.
 Zingiber tuanjuum Z.Y.Zhu
 Zingiber ultralimitale Ardiyani & A.D.Poulsen
 Zingiber vanlithianum Koord.
 Zingiber velutinum Mood & Theilade
 Zingiber ventricosum L.Bai, Škornick., N.H.Xia & Y.S.Ye
 Zingiber vinosum Mood & Theilade
 Zingiber viridiflavum Mood & Theilade
 Zingiber vittacheilum Triboun & K.Larsen
 Zingiber vuquangense N.S.Lý, T.H.Lê, T.H.Trinh, V.H.Nguyen & N.D.Do
 Zingiber wandingense S.Q.Tong
 Zingiber wightianum Thwaites
 Zingiber wrayi Prain ex Ridl.
 Zingiber yersinii Škornick., H.Ð.Tran & Rybková
 Zingiber yingjiangense S.Q.Tong
 Zingiber yunnanense S.Q.Tong & X.Z.Liu
 Zingiber zerumbet (L.) Roscoe ex Sm. : shampoo ginger
 Zingiber zhuxiense G.X.Hu & S.Huang

References

External links 

 Flora of North China – Zingiber

 
Edible plants
Medicinal plants
Spices
Zingiberoideae
Zingiberales genera
Taxa named by Philip Miller